Kachuiyeh (also Romanized as Kachū’īyeh and Kachūyeh) is a village in Zirkuh Rural District, Bagh-e Bahadoran District, Lenjan County, Isfahan Province, Iran. At the 2006 census, its population was 2,550, in 685 families.

References 

Populated places in Lenjan County